Stictoedopa is a genus of fly in the family Ulidiidae.

Species
Stictoedopa ruizi Brèthes, 1926

Distribution
Chile.

References

Ulidiidae
Monotypic Brachycera genera
Taxa named by Juan Brèthes
Endemic fauna of Chile
Diptera of South America
Brachycera genera